The 1997 Chinese Jia-A League (known as Marlboro Jia-A League for sponsorship reasons) was the fourth season of professional association football and the 36th top-tier overall league season held in China. Starting on March 16, 1997, and ending on November 29, 1997, it was performed by 12 teams and Dalian Wanda won the championship making it their third championship title.

Promotion and relegation

Teams promoted from 1996 Chinese Jia-B League
 Qianwei Huandao
 Qingdao Hainiu

Teams relegated from 1996 Chinese Jia-A League
 Shenzhen Feiyada
 Guangzhou Songri

League standings

References
China - List of final tables (RSSSF)

Chinese Jia-A League seasons
1
China
China
1997 establishments in China